Joeline Möbius (born ) was a German female artistic gymnast, representing her nation at international competitions.

She participated at the 2008 Summer Olympics in Beijing, China. She also competed at world championships, including the 2007 and 2010 World Artistic Gymnastics Championships in Rotterdam.

References

External links
database.fig-gymnastics.com
gymnecetic
gymnasticsresults.com
intigymnast.com
intigymnast.com
Getty Images
You Tube

1992 births
Living people
German female artistic gymnasts
Place of birth missing (living people)
Gymnasts at the 2008 Summer Olympics
Olympic gymnasts of Germany
20th-century German women
21st-century German women